The director-general (DG) is head of the Inter-Services Intelligence (ISI), Pakistan's premier intelligence service, operationally responsible for providing critical national security and intelligence assessment to the government of Pakistan. Colonel Shahid Hamid had conceived the idea of ISI. He was later promoted to a two-star rank of a major general and became the first director-general of the ISI. Robert Cawthome became instrumental in expanding the ISI and has been the longest serving director-general.

The current DG of ISI is Lt. General Nadeem Ahmed Anjum since 20 November 2021.

List of directors-general

Notes 

 1.Later promoted to major general in-office.
 2.Later promoted to lieutenant general in-office.

References

 
Pakistani military appointments
Pakistan